David J. McCarthy Jr. is Dean Emeritus of the Georgetown University Law Center, Washington, DC, USA from 1975 to 1983. McCarthy received a bachelor's degree from Fairfield University, and a J.D. J.D., LL.M., and an honorary LL.D. from Georgetown, where he was managing editor of the Georgetown Law Journal.

McCarthy became a professor of law at Georgetown in 1965 specializing in state and local government law, and has written a number of books on the topic.  Before coming to Georgetown McCarthy was an attorney at the United States Department of Justice and was the founding Director of the D.C. Bail Project.

Selected books
 And William D. Valente, Local Government Law: Cases and Materials (4th ed., 1992, & supp. 1995).
 Local Government Law in a Nutshell (4th ed., 1995).

References

Deans of law schools in the United States
Fairfield University alumni
Georgetown University Law Center faculty
Living people
Year of birth missing (living people)
Deans of Georgetown University Law Center